DD Bharati is a state owned TV channel telecasting from Doordarshan Kendra, Delhi. It telecasts various cultural programmes and is dedicated to show India's vast culture and traditions.

History
DD-Bharati Channel was launched on 26 January 2002. Besides programmes on adventure, quiz contests, fine arts/paintings, crafts and designs, cartoons, talent hunts, etc., it also telecasts MERI BAAT an hour-long phone-in 'live' show with young people.
Programmes emphasising on a healthy life style and focusing on prevention rather than cure, both in our traditional and modern forms of medicine are also being telecast. Classical dance/music performances by top class artists of national and international fame are also featured on this channel are programmes on theatre, literature, music, paintings, sculpture and architecture.
The channel also telecast programmes in collaboration with organisations like IGNCA, CEC, IGNOU, PSBT, NCERT and Sahitya Akademi. The channel also provides extensive coverage to the AIR sangeet sammelans. Contributions made by the Regional Doordarshan Kendra's are regularly telecast live/recorded.

DD Bharati is working as a Cultural Heritage of India.

It a dedicated channel to art and culture

Technology used by this Channel is standard sd channel

Now logo of this channel is changed and in the prime time slot of night at nine pm special shows dedicated to the classical music is telecasted and documentaries of various subjects are also telecasted from time to time and also some programs from dd archive also telecasted in morning slot these some facts makes this channel wonderful. 
The show ''Byomkesh Bakshi by Basu Chatterji also aired in DD Bharati.

See also
 List of programs broadcast by DD National
 All India Radio
 DD Direct Plus
 List of South Asian television channels by country
 Media in Chennai
 Ministry of Information and Broadcasting

References

External links
 Official site
 An article at PFC

Doordarshan
Foreign television channels broadcasting in the United Kingdom
Television channels and stations established in 1992
Direct broadcast satellite services
Indian direct broadcast satellite services
Television stations in New Delhi